The Pacifica Cup was an international cricket tournament contested in 2001 and 2002 by teams from the Pacific Islands.

2001 tournament

The 2001 tournament was played in Auckland, New Zealand.

Qualifying match
Eighth ranked vs Ninth ranked.

First round

The eight participating teams were divided into two pools of four teams for the first round.

Pool A

Fiji topped Pool A after winning all three of their matches, including a 362 run win against New Caledonia in their opening match. Tonga, who also beat New Caledonia by more than 300 runs, joined them in the semi-finals. Vanuatu finished third in the group ahead of the New Caledonians.

Pool B

Pool B was topped by the New Zealand Māori, with Papua New Guinea joining them in the semi-finals. The Cook Islands were third in the group, with Samoa at the bottom of the table.

Semi-finals

Plate semi-finals

7th place play-off

5th place play-off

3rd place play-off

Final

Final standings

2002 tournament

The 2002 tournament was played in Apia, Samoa, with all games taking place on various grounds of the Faleata Oval. Seven teams took part in the tournament, with the New Zealand Māori team not taking part this year.

First round

The seven teams were split into two pools, with Fiji and Papua New Guinea alone in Pool A, whilst Pool B consisted of the other five teams.

Pool A

Pool A was reduced to what was essentially a three-match series between Papua New Guinea and Fiji. All three matches were won by Papua New Guinea, who thus qualified for the final.

Pool B

Pool B was topped by Tonga, who reached the final after winning all four of their matches. As in 2001, New Caledonia were at the foot of the pool, losing all four of their matches, including a 314 run defeat at the hands of group runners-up the Cook Islands.

5th place play-off

3rd place play-off

Final

Final standings

See also
Cricket in Oceania
World Cricket League EAP region

References
2001 tournament at CricketEurope
2002 tournament at CricketEurope
2001 tournament at CricketArchive
2002 tournament at Cricket Archive

International cricket competitions
Cricket in Oceania